Phyllophaga scoparia is a species of scarab beetle in the family Scarabaeidae. It is found in Central America and North America.

References

 Evans, Arthur V. (2003). "A checklist of the New World chafers (Coleoptera: Scarabaeidae: Melolonthinae)".

Further reading

 Arnett, R.H. Jr., M. C. Thomas, P. E. Skelley and J. H. Frank. (eds.). (2002). American Beetles, Volume II: Polyphaga: Scarabaeoidea through Curculionoidea. CRC Press LLC, Boca Raton, FL.
 Arnett, Ross H. (2000). American Insects: A Handbook of the Insects of America North of Mexico. CRC Press.
 Richard E. White. (1983). Peterson Field Guides: Beetles. Houghton Mifflin Company.

Melolonthinae